Loney, Noir is the fourth album, but first major release, by Swedish indie pop artist Loney, Dear. In the United States, it was released on the Sub Pop label on February 6, 2007.

Track listing

 "Sinister in a State of Hope"
 "I Am John"
 "Saturday Waits"
 "Hard Days 1.2.3.4"
 "I Am the Odd One"
 "No One Can Win"
 "I Will Call You Lover Again"
 "Carrying a Stone"
 "The Meter Marks OK"
 "And I Won't Cause Anything at All"

2005 albums
Loney, Dear albums